Enrique Octavio Trejo Azuara (born 12 April 1970) is a Mexican politician from the National Action Party. From 2009 to 2012 he served as Deputy of the LXI Legislature of the Mexican Congress representing San Luis Potosí.

References

1951 births
Living people
People from San Luis Potosí
National Action Party (Mexico) politicians
21st-century Mexican politicians
Deputies of the LXI Legislature of Mexico
Members of the Chamber of Deputies (Mexico) for San Luis Potosí